On September 4, 2014 a three-judge panel of the Seventh Circuit Court of Appeals unanimously upheld district court rulings striking down same-sex marriage bans in Indiana, and Wisconsin, just nine days after the court heard oral arguments. The Seventh Circuit consists of Illinois, Indiana, and Wisconsin. Same-sex marriage was already legal in Illinois before the Circuit Court's decision. Same-sex marriages were performed in Indiana and Wisconsin after their bans were struck down by district courts and before those decisions were stayed. Recognition of out-of-state same-sex marriage was possibly de jure legal in Indiana until Baskin v. Bogan was stayed by the Seventh Circuit. On October 6, 2014, the Supreme Court of the United States denied cert, legalizing same-marriage in both Indiana and Wisconsin. As a result, same-sex marriage is legal in every state within the circuit.

See also 
Same-sex marriage
Same-sex marriage in the Fourth Circuit
Same-sex marriage in the Ninth Circuit
Same-sex marriage in the Sixth Circuit
Same-sex marriage in the Tenth Circuit

References

United States Court of Appeals for the Seventh Circuit
7